The Aero A.101 was a biplane light bomber and reconnaissance aircraft built in Czechoslovakia during the 1930s.

Design and development
The Aero A.101 was an attempt to improve the Aero A.100 by enlarging it and fitting it with a more powerful engine. However, even with 33% more power, performance was actually inferior, and the Czechoslovak Air Force was not interested in the type. Production did result when 50 were ordered by Spanish Republican forces for use in the Spanish Civil War. Some of these aircraft were captured by Nationalists while en route and used against their original buyers.

Local demand eventually was forthcoming, and a re-engined version was produced as the Ab.101.

Operators

Czechoslovakian Air Force

Slovak Air Force (1939-1945)

Spanish Republican Air Force

Spanish Nationalist Air Force

Specifications (A.101)

See also

References

External links

1930s Czechoslovakian bomber aircraft
1930s Czechoslovakian military reconnaissance aircraft
Biplanes
Single-engined tractor aircraft
A101